Atlas is an upcoming American science fiction thriller film directed by Brad Peyton from a screenplay by Leo Sardarian and Aron Eli Coleite. Jennifer Lopez will produce and star in the film, with Simu Liu, Sterling K. Brown Lana Parrilla and Abraham Popoola.

Atlas is a co-production of Netflix, Safehouse Pictures, ASAP Entertainment, Nuyorican Productions and Berlanti-Schechter Films, and is set to be released on Netflix.

Cast 
 Jennifer Lopez
 Simu Liu
 Sterling K. Brown
 Abraham Popoola
 Lana Parrilla

Production 
The screenplay was originally written by Leo Sardarian, and Aron Eli Coleite performed rewrites. Simu Liu, Sterling K. Brown, and Abraham Popoola joined the cast in August 2022. In September 2022, it was reported that Lana Parrilla has joined the cast.

Principal photography began on August 26, 2022, in Los Angeles and New Zealand, and wrapped on November 26.

References

External links 
 

Upcoming films
American science fiction thriller films
Films directed by Brad Peyton
Films produced by Greg Berlanti
Films shot in Los Angeles
Films shot in New Zealand
Nuyorican Productions films
Upcoming English-language films
Upcoming Netflix original films